Appius Claudius Pulcher (died 211 BC) was a Roman general and politician of the 3rd century BC, active in the Second Punic War.

Family
He was the son of Publius Claudius Pulcher (consul 249 BC), and the father of Appius Claudius Pulcher (consul 185 BC), Publius Claudius Pulcher (consul 184 BC), and Gaius Claudius Pulcher (consul 177 BC). His daughter, Claudia, married Pacuvius Calavius, the chief magistrate of Capua in 217 BC.

Career
In 217 BC, Claudius was an aedile. In the following year, he was a military tribune and fought at Cannae. Together with Publius Cornelius Scipio, he was raised to the supreme command by the troops who had fled to Canusium. In 215 BC, he was created a praetor, and conducted the survivors of the defeated army into Sicily, where his efforts to detach Hieronymus, the grandson of Hiero II, from his connection with the Carthaginians, were unsuccessful. He remained in Sicily the following year as propraetor and legatus to Marcus Claudius Marcellus, having charge of the fleet and the camp at Leontini. In 212 BC, he was elected consul, and in conjunction with his colleague Quintus Fulvius Flaccus undertook the siege of Capua. At the close of his year of office, in pursuance of a decree of the Senate, he went to Rome and created two new consuls. His own command was prolonged another year. In the battle against Hannibal's forces before Capua, he received a wound from whose effects he died shortly after the surrender of the city. He ineffectually opposed the infliction of the sanguinary vengeance that Fulvius took on the Capuans.

In popular culture
Appius Claudius Pulcher was played by Dimitri Diatchenko in the 2006 film The Secret Under the Rose.

Notes

References

This entry incorporates public domain text originally from:
William Smith (ed.), Dictionary of Greek and Roman Biography and Mythology, 1870.

211 BC deaths
3rd-century BC Roman consuls
3rd-century BC Roman praetors
Curule aediles
Appius consul 542 AUC
Roman commanders of the Second Punic War
Year of birth unknown